William Fowler may refer to:

Politicians
William Fowler (MP for  Cambridge) (1828–1905), English MP and barrister
William Fowler (MP for Wycombe), English justice of the peace and member of parliament for Wycombe, 1431
Wyche Fowler (William Wyche Fowler, Jr., born 1940), American politician and diplomat
William Fowler (Brothertown Indian) (1815–1862), first non-white Wisconsin legislator; killed in the U.S. Civil War
William Fowler (New Hampshire politician), member of the New Hampshire House of Representatives

Sports
William Herbert Fowler (1856–1941), English amateur cricketer and golf course architect, also known as Bill
Bill Fowler (cricketer, born 1959), English cricketer

Military
William M. Fowler (born 1944), American naval historian
W. M. W. Fowler (1914–1977), English Royal Air Force pilot

Others
William Fowler (artist) (1761–1832), English artist
William Fowler (architect) (1824–1906), Scottish architect
William Fowler (makar) (c. 1560–1612), Scottish writer
 William Chauncey Fowler (1793–1881), Nineteenth-century American scholar
William Fowler (Mormon) (1830–1865), Latter-day Saints hymn writer
William Weekes Fowler (1849–1923), English entomologist who wrote the Coleoptera of the British Islands
William Alfred Fowler (1911–1995), American astrophysicist who studied nuclear reactions in stars
William Hope Fowler (1876–1933), Scottish physician and pioneer of radiology
William Warde Fowler (1847–1921), English historian and ornithologist
William Henry Fowler (1854–1932), founder of Fowler's Calculators
William Fowler, a fictional character in the animated series Transformers: Prime

See also
William Fowler Mountford Copeland II, horticulturalist